Textual variants in the Numbers concerns textual variants in the Hebrew Bible found in the Book of Numbers.

Legend

List 

This list provides examples of known textual variants, and contains the following parameters: Hebrew texts written right to left, the Hebrew text romanised left to right, an approximate English translation, and which Hebrew manuscripts or critical editions of the Hebrew Bible this textual variant can be found in. Greek (Septuagint) and Latin (Vulgate) texts are written left to right, and not romanised. Sometimes additional translation or interpretation notes are added, with references to similar verses elsewhere, or in-depth articles on the topic in question.
 Numbers 22 
Numbers 22:1
  – WLC
  – SP
  – LXX LXX Brenton ABP
 The words  arabah/'aravá ("steppe", "desert", "plain"),  érev ("evening", "sunset") and  ma'aráv ("west") are all etymologically related to each other, and maybe also cognates of words such as "Europe" (see Europe § Name) and "Arab" (see Etymology of Arab). See also Numbers 31:12.

 Numbers 31 

Numbers 31:12
  – WLC
  – LXX Brenton
  – ABP
 It is unclear whether the Hebrew original meant a general geographical feature ('plains/desert/wilderness') or a specific toponym (probably the region now known as "Arabah"), or whether Greek translators failed to translate  ‘ar-ḇōṯ as a general geographical feature and turned it into a specific toponym, and hence the Arabah region got its name from this toponymisation. See also Numbers 22:1.

Numbers 31:15
  – MT
  – SP
  – LXX
  – ABP Brenton

Numbers 31:16
  – MT
  – LXX ABP Brenton. ἀποστῆσαι is a cognate of the English word "apostasy".
 See also Numbers 31 § Tabernacle desecration hypothesis.

Numbers 31:16
  – MT
  – LXX ABP Brenton

Numbers 31:17
  – MT
  – LXX ABP Brenton

Numbers 31:17
  – MT
  – LXX ABP
  – Brenton
 Compare Judges 21:11.

Numbers 31:18
  – WLC
  – LXX 
  – Brenton
  – ABP

Numbers 31:18
  – WLC
 – LXX
  – Brenton ABP

Numbers 31:18
  – WLC
 – LXX Brenton ABP
 Compare Judges 21:11

 Numbers 32 
Numbers 32:1
  – MT
  – [4QNumb] SP
  – LXX ABP Brenton
 Compare Numbers 32:33

Numbers 32:2
  – MT
  – SP
  – LXX ABP Brenton

Numbers 32:3
  – MT SP
  – LXX Brenton
  – ABP

Numbers 32:4
  – MT, see also :en:wikt:הוא#Hebrew
  – SP, see also :en:wikt:היא#Hebrew
  – LXX 
  – ABP Brenton

Numbers 32:6
  – MT
  – [4QNum] SP
  – LXX ABP Brenton

See also 
 List of Hebrew Bible manuscripts

References

Bibliography 
 
 
 
 
  (E-book edition)
 
 Emanuel Tov, The Text-Critical Use of the Septuagint in Biblical Research (TCU), 1981 (1st edition), 1997 (2nd edition), 2015 (3rd edition).
 Emanuel Tov, Textual Criticism of the Hebrew Bible (TCHB), 1992 (1st edition), 2001 (2nd edition), 2012 (3rd edition).
 Emanuel Tov, Textual Criticism of the Hebrew Bible, Qumran, Septuagint: Collected Writings, Volume 3 (2015).

External links 
 Digitized Hebrew and Greek Manuscripts: Access and Issues – Introduction to online biblical textual studies

Biblical criticism
Early versions of the Bible
Book of Numbers
Hebrew Bible versions and translations
Jewish manuscripts
Old Testament-related lists
Septuagint manuscripts
Textual criticism